1980s in Ghana details events of note that happened in Ghana in the years 1980 to 1989.

Incumbents
President: Hilla Limann (1979–1981)
President: Jerry Rawlings (1981–2000)

Events
27 November 1981 - British synth pop band Soft Cell released their debut album Non-Stop Erotic Cabaret
31 December 1981 - in another Jerry Rawlings -led coup the Hilla Limann government is overthrown.
31 December 1981 - the Provisional National Defense Council (PNDC) forms a new government.
5 January 1982 - Jerry Rawlings presents a detailed statement explaining the factors that necessitated the termination of the Third Republic in a radio broadcast.
June 1982 - an attempted coup attempt discovered, those implicated are executed.
1983 - more than one million Ghanaians return to Ghana after being expelled from Nigeria.
1983-84 - widespread bush fires devastate crop production.
1987 - economic progress results in a drop of inflation to 20 percent.

National holidays
 January 1: New Year's Day
 March 6: Independence Day
 May 1: Labor Day
 December 25: Christmas
 December 26: Boxing day

In addition, several other places observe local holidays, such as the foundation of their town. These are also "special days."

References